Atlantic School of Osteopathy was a former school of osteopathy, which was founded in Wilkes-Barre, Pennsylvania in 1898 and then moved to Buffalo, New York in 1904.

History
In 1898 Dr. Schuyler C. Mathews and Dr. Virgil A. Hook recruited several influential philanthropists, formed an organization, and then received a charter for the Atlantic School of Osteopathy on February 21, 1899. The first presidents of the school were "Dr. V. A. Hook, Mr. J. C. Bell, and Dr. [John] W. Banning" and the first term began in February 1899. Dr. William Smith, a Scottish physician, briefly served as president in 1900. 

Originally the school was located in the Simon Long Building in Wilkes-Barre until the school purchased and remodeled the Central Methodist Episcopal Church in that same city. In 1904, the school moved to Buffalo, New York. In 1905, the Buffalo Municipal Court issued a warrant for Banning's arrest due to his issuing diplomas without approval from the state board of regents. 

By 1906, the Atlantic School of Osteopathy merged with the American School of Osteopathy (now known as A.T. Still University) based in Missouri.

References

Osteopathic medical schools in the United States
A. T. Still University
Medical schools in New York (state)
Medical schools in Pennsylvania
Education in Buffalo, New York
Wilkes-Barre, Pennsylvania
Defunct schools in Pennsylvania 
Defunct schools in New York (state)